Ricardo "Richie" Garcia is a Filipino sports executive who formerly served as chairman of the Philippine Sports Commission.

Background
Garcia is a native of Bacolod who attended the De La Salle University. He was first appointed as commissioner of the Philippine Sports Commission (PSC) by President Joseph Estrada in 1999 and was reappointed to the post by Estrada's successor, Gloria Macapagal Arroyo. He was appointed as chairman of the PSC on July 19, 2010 by then President Benigno Aquino III.

Aquino received a recommendation from Philippine Olympic Committee President Peping Cojuangco to appoint Ramirez. Ramirez and Cojuangco reportedly are golfing buddies.

References

Living people
Chairpersons of the Philippine Sports Commission
People from Bacolod
Benigno Aquino III administration personnel
Year of birth missing (living people)